1948 Albanian Cup was the second season of Albania's annual cup competition. It began in Spring 1948 with the First Round and ended in May 1948 with the Final match. Tirana were the defending champions, having won their first Albanian Cup last season. The cup was won by Partizani.

The rounds were played in a one-legged format. If the number of goals was equal, the match was decided by extra time and a penalty shootout, if necessary.

First round
Games were played in March, 1948*

|}

Second round
Games were played in March, 1948*

 

|}

Third round
Games were played in March, 1948*

 

|}

Quarter-finals
In this round entered the 8 winners from the previous round*

 

|}
+ Played in Tiranë.

Semi-finals
In this round entered the four winners from the previous round*

 

|}

Final

References

 Calcio Mondiale Web

External links
 Calcio Mondiale Web

Cup
1948 domestic association football cups
1948